This is a list of civil defense sirens.

Alerting Communicators of America (ACA) sirens

 ACA Allertor
 ACA Cyclone
 ACA Hurricane

ATI sirens
 ATI HPSS

Federal Signal sirens
 Thunderbolt (siren)
 Federal Signal 3T22 / 2T22
 Federal Signal Model 2
 Federal Signal Modulator
 Federal Signal STH-10

Other
 Chrysler Air-Raid Siren
 Sentry Siren
 SiraTone

Sirens
Disaster preparedness
Civil defense
Emergency population warning systems